Ninja Gaiden is a series of video games released by Tecmo.

Ninja Gaiden may also refer to:

 Ninja Gaiden (arcade game), a 1988 side-scrolling beat-'em-up
 Ninja Gaiden (NES video game), a 1988 side-scrolling platforming video game
 Ninja Gaiden (Atari Lynx video game), a 1990 action game
 Ninja Gaiden (1991 OVA), aka Ninja Ryūkenden, a 1991 anime OVA film released in Japan
 Ninja Gaiden (Game Gear), a 1991 action video game
 Ninja Gaiden (Master System), a 1992 action video game
 Ninja Gaiden (2004 video game), a 2004 action-adventure game for the Xbox console